Erich "Schmidtchen" Schmidt (17 November 1914 – 31 August 1941) was a Luftwaffe ace and recipient of the Knight's Cross of the Iron Cross during World War II.

Career
After completing his flight training, at the start of the war in September 1939, Leutnant Schmidt was in the 2nd Staffel of Jagdgeschwader 53 (2./JG 53). Transferred to 9th Staffel (9./JG 53) in the following February, he had no success in the French campaign, and his first victory was on 12 August 1940 when he shot down a Spitfire over the Isle of Wight. He was far more successful in the Battle of Britain however, and he had 17 victories by end of November 1940, when he was transferred briefly to the Stab (HQ) flight of III./JG 53 as Gruppe-Adjutant.

But he was back with 9./JG 53 for the invasion of Russia Operation Barbarossa. With his unit covering the advance of Hoth's panzers on the northern side of Army Group Centre, on the opening day of the campaign (22 June 1941) he shot down four Russian aircraft, and his 30th victory was an I-16 fighter on 4 July. For that score he was awarded the Knight's Cross by the newly promoted General of Fighters Werner Mölders on 23 July. His unit was constantly on the move, leap-frogging forward to airbases often only cleared of enemy a day or two before. Barely staying a few days to a week at a time, their mission was to protect the ground troops from enemy bombers as the blitzkrieg stormed eastward past Minsk, Vitebsk, Smolensk, toward Moscow.

On 26 July he shot down 5 DB-3 bombers, 3 in the morning and 2 more in the afternoon. He shot down his final three victories on 29 August taking his total to 47. But on 31 August 1941, returning from a freie Jagd (free hunt), he was himself shot down after being hit by Soviet anti-aircraft fire east of Velikiye Luki. Baling out behind enemy lines, he was never seen again. At the time he was the top-scoring pilot of III/JG 53, and was posthumously promoted to Oberleutnant.

Victories

Awards
 Flugzeugführerabzeichen
 Front Flying Clasp of the Luftwaffe
 Iron Cross (1939)
 2nd Class
 1st Class
 Knight's Cross of the Iron Cross on 23 July 1941 as Leutnant and pilot in the III./Jagdgeschwader 53

Notes

References

Citations

Bibliography

 
 
 
 Spick, Mike (1996). Luftwaffe Fighter Aces. New York: Ivy Books.     .
 Weal, John (1996). Bf109D/E Aces 1939-41. Oxford: Osprey Publishing Limited.	.
 Weal, John (2001). Bf109 Aces of the Russian Front. Oxford: Osprey Publishing Limited.	.
 Weal, John (2007). Aviation Elite Units #25: Jagdgeschwader 53 Pik-As’. Oxford: Osprey Publishing Limited. .

External links
Aces of the Luftwaffe
 Retrieved 29 December 2012
 Retrieved 7 January 2013
 Retrieved 7 January 2013

1914 births
1941 deaths
People from Neuhaus am Rennweg
People from Saxe-Meiningen
Recipients of the Knight's Cross of the Iron Cross
German World War II flying aces
Luftwaffe personnel killed in World War II
Aviators killed by being shot down
Luftwaffe pilots
Military personnel from Thuringia